KSBH (94.9 FM, "94.9 The River") is a radio station broadcasting a country music format. Licensed to Coushatta, Louisiana, United States, the station serves Red River, Natchitoches Parish and surrounding areas from a studio located in Natchitoches, Louisiana.  The station is currently owned by Elite Radio Group.

References

External links

Country radio stations in the United States
Natchitoches Parish, Louisiana
Radio stations in Louisiana
Red River Parish, Louisiana
Sabine County, Texas
Elite Radio Group